Latrop is a river of North Rhine-Westphalia, Germany. It flows from the village of Latrop to Waidmannsruh and in Fleckenberg into the Lenne.

See also

List of rivers of North Rhine-Westphalia

References

Rivers of North Rhine-Westphalia
Rivers of Germany